This is a brief  timeline of the history of Canada, comprising important social, economic, political, military, legal, and territorial changes and events in Canada and its predecessor states.

Prehistory

8th century

10th century

12th century

15th century

16th century

17th century

18th century

19th century

20th century

21st century

See also

 History of Canada
 Historiography of Canada
 Events of National Historic Significance
 List of years in Canada
 Heritage Minutes
 National Historic Sites of Canada
 Persons of National Historic Significance

References

Bibliography

Further reading

 
 
 
 Hill, Brian H. W. Canada, 875-1973: A Chronology and Fact Book (1973)
 

 Norrie, Kenneth, Douglas Owram and J.C. Herbert Emery. (2002) A History of the Canadian Economy (4th ed. 2007)
 
  ,

External links

 Canada Year Book (CYB) annual 1867–1967
 Events of National Historic Significance
 National Historic Sites of Canada
 Persons of National Historic Significance in Canada 
 The Dictionary of Canadian Biography
 Canada`` – UCB Libraries GovPubs
 Canadian Studies – Guide to the Sources
 The Historica-Dominion Institute

Canadian